Derrick McAdoo is an American former professional football player who was a running back in the National Football League (NFL) and Canadian Football League (CFL). He was a CFL All-Star in 1989.

McAdoo signed with the St. Louis Cardinals in 1987 after playing football with the Baylor Bears. He rushed for 230 yards in his first season.. He came to Canada in 1989 and played with the Hamilton Tiger-Cats. He had a career season, rushing for 1039 yards and was chosen as an all-star. He later played one season (4 regular season games) with the Toronto Argonauts He now lives in Katy, Texas with his wife and two children.

References

1965 births
Living people
Players of Canadian football from Pensacola, Florida
Hamilton Tiger-Cats players
Toronto Argonauts players
Phoenix Cardinals players
St. Louis Cardinals (football) players
Tampa Bay Buccaneers players
Canadian football running backs
Baylor Bears football players
Players of American football from Pensacola, Florida
American players of Canadian football
National Football League replacement players